By Indian Post is a 1919 American short Western silent film directed by John Ford. An incomplete version of the film has survived.

Cast
 Pete Morrison as Jode MacWilliams
 Duke R. Lee as Pa Owens
 Magda Lane as Peg Owens
 Edward Burnsas (credited as Ed Burns)
 Jack Woods as Dutch
 Harley Chambers as Fritz
 Hoot Gibson as Chub

See also
 List of American films of 1919
 Hoot Gibson filmography

References

External links
 

1919 films
1919 Western (genre) films
1919 short films
American silent short films
American black-and-white films
Films directed by John Ford
Silent American Western (genre) films
1910s American films
1910s English-language films